Elassona is a town and a municipality in the Larissa regional unit in Greece. During antiquity Elassona was called Oloosson (Ὀλοοσσών) and was a town of the Perrhaebi tribe. It is situated at the foot of Mount Olympus. Elassona is bypassed by the GR-3 (Larissa - Kozani - Florina).

History

Due to its location on the passes leading from the Thessalian plain to Macedonia, the site of Elassona was always of some strategic importance.

Middle Ages 
Known as Olo[ö]sson (Ὀλο[ο]σσών) in antiquity, in the early Byzantine period it was known as Lossonos, and was one of the sites refortified under Justinian I. the modern name first appears in the writings of the 12th-century scholar and archbishop Eustathius of Thessalonica, who considered it "barbaric". At the turn of the 14th century, the Panagia Olympiotissa Monastery was founded on the hilltop citadel. In 1304, Guy II de la Roche, Duke of Athens, passed through during a campaign against the Despotate of Epirus.

Following the death of Stephen Gabrielopoulos in 1333, Elassona was one of the Thessalian towns (along with Stagoi, Trikala, Damasis, and Fanari) that for a short while fell under the rule of the Epirote ruler John II Orsini. Under Andronikos III Palaiologos, privileges were granted to the Olympiotissa monastery, and the town became the seat of an archbishopric, a status it retained into the Ottoman period.

Ottoman Era 
In 1521 (Hijri 927) the town of Elassona had 35 Muslim and 311 Christian households. During the Ottoman period devshirme was practiced in the area and there were janissaries from Elassona. For example, Ottoman registrar from 1603-4 state that boys were taken from "Alasonya" and "Dominik". Some Christians of Elassona also rebelled in 1821 under the Captain of Elassona. However, in less than a year they asked for amnesty under the same captain and stated that the reaya of some other localities are about to follow suit and were granted amnesty. The Ottomans declared in February 1822 that if the rebellious reaya beg for pardon, their appeal were to be accepted, so long as they meet the specified conditions.

Unlike the rest of Thessaly, which was annexed by Greece in 1881, Elassona (Alasonya) remained part of the Ottoman Empire until 1912, when it joined Greece (along with Crete, Macedonia and Epirus) following victory in the Balkan Wars.

Municipality

The municipality Elassona was formed at the 2011 local government reform by the merger of the following 9 former municipalities, that became municipal units:
Antichasia
Elassona
Karya
Livadi
Olympos
Potamia
Sarantaporo
Tsaritsani
Verdikoussa

Subdivisions
The municipal unit of Elassona is divided into the following communities:
Elassona (Elassona, Agioneri, Aetorrachi, Mikro Eleftherochori)
Drymos
Evangelismos
Galanovrysi
Kefalovryso
Palaiokastro
Stefanovouno (Stefanovouno, Lefki)
Valanida (Valanida, Kleisoura)
Kranea

Municipal changes
Until March 15, 2006, Tsaritsani was part of the municipality (now municipal unit) of Elassona and functioned as a municipal district. Under the law 3448/15-3-2006, Tsaritsani got separated from the municipality and declared a commune. The loss of its population and land leaves the remaining municipality with an adjusted 2001 census population of 12,056 and a land area of 291.097 km².

Province
The province of Elassona was one of the provinces of the Larissa Prefecture. It had the same territory as the present municipality. It was abolished in 2006.

Population
(Statistics, 1981-2011)

Geography

The municipality Elassona has an area of 1565.2 km2, the municipal unit Elassona has an area of 291.097 km2 (excluding Tsaritsani), and the community Elassona has an area of 102.515 km2.

Its geography includes farmlands in the valley areas, the mountains to the west and east and forests in the west and east as well as grasslands, ledges are to be founded in some areas and barren area in the higher elevations.

The rivers Elassonitis (or Elassonitikos) and Titarisio flow through Elassona and they both flow into the Pineios River, Thessaly's longest river. The river divides the town into two parts, the older city built on the Olympiotissa hill and is also Varosi or Varossi (Βαρόσι), and the new city on the right bank of the river. These two parts of the city are connected by four bridges, one of which is an ancient stone arch bridge. The other part is near the Kefalovrysi Lake.

Transportation
Elassona is linked with the old GR-3 and is bypassed to the east. Elassona is located 70 km southwest of Katerini, 38 km NNW of Larissa (old: about 50 km), 22 km NW of Tyrnavos (old: 30 km), east of Deskati and Grevena and 78 km ESE of Kozani.

Landmarks and monuments
 
 Elassona Mosque
 
 Panagia Olympiotissa Monastery
 Agia Triada Monastery, Sparmos

References

External links

Elassona.gr - Elassona guide 
Elassona.com.gr - Elassona guide 

Municipalities of Thessaly
Provinces of Greece
Populated places in Larissa (regional unit)
Aromanian settlements in Greece